Mahreghan (also Romanized as Mahreghān) is a village in Gurband Rural District, in the Central District of Minab County, Hormozgan Province, Iran. At the 2006 census, its population was 138, in 34 families.

References 

Populated places in Minab County